Marriage is a 2022 British television drama series, starring Nicola Walker and Sean Bean as a married couple in a long term domestic relationship. It was created, written and directed by Stefan Golaszewski. The four-part series opened on 14 August 2022 on BBC One. It was simultaneously made available in full to stream, on BBC iPlayer.

Cast
Sean Bean as Ian, Emma's husband who has recently been made redundant
Nicola Walker as Emma, Ian's wife who is a solicitor
Chantelle Alle as Jessica, Ian and Emma's adoptive daughter and a singer
Henry Lloyd-Hughes as Jamie, Emma's boss
Jack Holden as Adam, Jessica's abusive boyfriend and a record producer
James Bolam as Gerry, Emma's father
Makir Ahmed as Mike, Emma's colleague
Kath Hughes as Claire, Emma's colleague
Ella Augustin as Maxine, an employee at the local leisure centre
Hector Hewer as Kieran, an employee at the local leisure centre
Shona McHugh as Emily, an employee at Jamie's company who is on work experience
Kemal Sylvester as Paul, Emma's brother
Miles Barrow as Mark, a restaurant employee who befriends Jessica

Production
In September 2021, it was announced that the BBC had commissioned Golaszewski's new drama, starring Walker and Bean. It was a co-production between The Forge and The Money Men, in association with All3Media International.

The theme tune "Partita for 8 Voices: No 1, Allemande", an a cappella work by the American composer Caroline Shaw.

Episode list

Reception
The series received mostly very good reviews from critics, and mixed reviews from viewers. The Telegraph praised the first episode and gave it five out of five stars. Ben East of Metro, similarly, praised the first episode and gave it four stars. Rebecca Nicholson for The Guardian gave the first episode four out of five stars, remarking, 'There is a pitch-perfect realism to the way these characters talk without really saying anything, then put across what they really mean while saying nothing at all. It’s so cleverly done.'

By contrast, Nick Hilton, writing for The Independent, gave Marriage two out of five stars, adding that the show would "bore you to tears".

References

External links 
 

2022 British television series debuts
2022 British television series endings
2020s British drama television series
2020s British television miniseries
English-language television shows